Pakistan Volleyball Federation (PVF) is the national governing body to develop and promote the sport of Volleyball in the Country. The Federation was formed in 1955 and volleyball activities at the national level were taken up in an organized manner. PVF is affiliated with the International Volleyball Federation (FIVB) and Asian Volleyball Confederation (AVC).

Achievements
In 1958, Pakistan National Volleyball team visited Iran for playing with the national team of Iran.  Pakistan Volleyball won all the matches against Iran.
In 1989, Pakistan Volleyball team obtained 4th position in the Asian Volleyball Championship held in Seoul and defeated national team of India in the 4th South Asian Federation Games held in Islamabad.
In 1994, Pakistan Junior team managed to win the seven matches series against China.  
In 2007, Pakistan Volleyball Team won one silver and one Bronze medal in 2nd Asian Central Zone Volleyball Championship held in Colombo, Sri Lanka and the 2nd Commonwealth Volleyball Championship held in India respectively.
In 2008, Pakistan Junior Volleyball Team won one Bronze medal in the 14th Asian Junior Men’s Volleyball Championship held in Tehran, Iran.
In 2022, Pakistan Volleyball Team beat Iran and won Central Asian Zone Volleyball Championship held in Lahore, Pakistan.

Presently, the Pakistan Volleyball team standing positions are; 41 out of 220 in the World and 7 out of 64 in the Asia.
Atif Ali Keerio is also best player of  volley ball team of cadet college sanghar sindh.
Height (5.11)

Affiliations
 International Federation of Volleyball
 Asian Volleyball Confederation
 Pakistan Sports Board
 Pakistan Olympic Association

See also
 Pakistan men's national volleyball team

References

External links
 Official Website

National members of the Asian Volleyball Confederation
Sports governing bodies in Pakistan
Volleyball in Pakistan
1955 establishments in Pakistan
Sports organizations established in 1955